Marco Capuano (born 14 October 1991) is an Italian professional footballer who plays as a central defender for Ternana.

Club career

Pescara 
Capuano made his debut with the senior team in the away draw for 1–1 against Frosinone. He obtained 10 appearances in the 2010–11 Serie B season. He also signed a new 3-year contract in December 2010.

During the 2011–12 season, Capuano became a more regular starter under new manager Zdenek Zeman. His run in the starting eleven was soured by a controversial straight red card which led to a penalty in the 20 November match against Gubbio.

He made his Serie A debut on 26 August 2012, in the match lost 3–0 against Inter Milan.

Frosinone
On 17 August 2018, Capuano signed with Serie A side Frosinone.

Ternana
On 2 September 2021, he signed a two-year contract with Ternana in Serie B.

Career statistics

References

External links 
 
 Profile on Lega Serie B website
 

1991 births
Living people
Association football central defenders
Italian footballers
Serie A players
Serie B players
Delfino Pescara 1936 players
Cagliari Calcio players
F.C. Crotone players
Frosinone Calcio players
Ternana Calcio players
Portugal youth international footballers
Italy under-21 international footballers